Mira is a star in the constellation Cetus

Mira may also refer to:

Arts and entertainment

Film and television
 Mira (1971 film), a Dutch-Belgian film by Fons Rademakers
 Mira, Royal Detective, a Disney Junior animated television series

Gaming
 Mira, a planet that is the main setting of Xenoblade Chronicles X
 MIRA, a fictitious company in Among Us

Music
 Mira Records, a record label from 1965 to 1968
 Mira (band), an American darkwave band
 Mira (world music ensemble), an English world music ensemble
 Mira Calix, stage name of South African electronic musician Chantal Passamonte (born 1970)
 Mira (album), a 2014 album by Arild Andersen
 PRS Mira, a model of guitar from PRS Guitars

Businesses
 MIRA Ltd., a UK automotive engineering and development consultancy company
 Mira (shopping center), a shopping center in Munich
 The Mira Hong Kong, a hotel
 Mira Books, a book publishing imprint of Harlequin Enterprises
 Macquarie Infrastructure and Real Assets, New York-based subsidiary of privately held Macquarie Holdings (USA) Inc.

Organizations
 Mira Foundation, a foundation dedicated to assisting people with disabilities
 Movement for Islamic Reform in Arabia, a Saudi London-based dissident group
 Independent Movement of Absolute Renovation (Movimiento Independiente de Renovación Absoluta), a Colombian political party

People and fictional characters
 Mira (given name), including a list of people and fictional characters with the name
 Mira (surname), including a list of people with the name
 Pen name of Mary Leapor (1722–1746), English poet

Places
 Kingdom of Mira, part of the kingdom of Arzawa in western Anatolia
 Mira River (Nova Scotia), Canada
 Mira Canton, Ecuador
 Mira River (Ecuador and Colombia)
 Mira, Nadia, a census town in West Bengal, India
 Mira, Veneto, a town near Venice, Italy
 Mira, Portugal, a municipality
 Mira River (Portugal)
 Mira, Spain, a municipality
 Mira, Illinois, United States, an unincorporated community
 Mira, Louisiana, United States, an unincorporated community

Science and technology
 Mira (supercomputer), constructed by IBM and now retired
 MIRA procedure, a medical treatment involving tissue grafting and adult stem cells
 Margin-infused relaxed algorithm, a machine-learning algorithm
 Middleware for Robotic Applications, a framework for robotic applications
 Monterey Institute for Research in Astronomy, an observatory located in Monterey County, California, United States
 Mira, a wasp genus in the family Encyrtidae
 Mira, the codename for Smart Display, a 2002 Microsoft product for a portable touchscreen terminal

Ships
 Mira (AK-84), a ship that was never commissioned and instead became the U.S. Army Engineer Port Repair Ship Robert M. Emery
 USS Mira (SP-118), a motor launch scheduled for World War I use, but never commissioned
 , various ships

Other uses
 Daihatsu Mira, a compact car model
 Mira Airport, an airport in Serbia
 3633 Mira, an asteroid
 MIRA (building), a building under construction in San Francisco
 Members of the Royal Irish Academy

See also
 Meera (disambiguation)
 Mira-Bhayandar, a municipality in Maharashtra, India
 Mira variable, a type of star named after the supergiant star Mira
 Miraa or khat, a plant
 Myra (disambiguation)